The Eswatini Single Mothers Organisation (SWASMO) is a small organisation of volunteers who work with mobilising and educating poor single mothers in the poorest areas of Manzini, Eswatini, in self-reliance, self-awareness and health-related issues. The organisation was founded in January 2009 by Beatrice Bitchong.

SWASMO's projects incorporate income generating projects and education on agricultural skills, management, sexual matters such as contraception, and family planning. The income generating projects include the making of clothes and scarves, handicraft items and vegetable gardens. SWASMO also trains the group members in facilitation skills to ensure that the project can eventually continue without outside help, and its projects are participatory in nature. SWASMO also offers individual and group counselling, home visits, and food and clothes support.

References

External links
SWASMO official website
Article in the Times of Swaziland
SWASMO: Helping Swaziland's most vulnerable women to help themselves
Article from AfricaFiles
Article from Public Eye
Article from U-landsnyt

Women's rights in Eswatini
Women's organisations based in Eswatini
Organizations established in 2009
2009 establishments in Swaziland
Manzini Region